Epinysson is a genus of wasps in the family Crabronidae. There are more than 20 described species in Epinysson.

Species
These 23 species belong to the genus Epinysson:

 Epinysson albomarginatus (Cresson, 1882)
 Epinysson arentis R. Bohart, 1968
 Epinysson aztecus (Cresson, 1882)
 Epinysson basilaris (Cresson, 1882)
 Epinysson bellus (Cresson, 1882)
 Epinysson bifasciatus (Brèthes, 1913)
 Epinysson borinquinensis (Pate, 1937)
 Epinysson casali (Fritz, 1968)
 Epinysson desertus R. Bohart, 1968
 Epinysson inconspicuus (Ducke, 1910)
 Epinysson mellipes (Cresson, 1882)
 Epinysson metathoracicus (H. Smith, 1908)
 Epinysson moestus (Cresson, 1882)
 Epinysson opulentus (Gerstäcker, 1867)
 Epinysson orientalis (Alayo Dalmau, 1969)
 Epinysson pacificus (Rohwer, 1917)
 Epinysson partamona (Pate, 1938)
 Epinysson sigua (Pate, 1938)
 Epinysson tomentosus (Handlirsch, 1887)
 Epinysson torridus R. Bohart, 1968
 Epinysson tramosericus (Viereck, 1904)
 Epinysson tuberculatus (Handlirsch, 1887)
 Epinysson zapotecus (Cresson, 1882)

References

Crabronidae